The Indraéro Aéro 30 is a single seat, single engined sports biplane designed in France in the late 1960s.  Only one was built.

Design and development

Design and construction of the Aéro 30 began in the autumn of 1967. It first flew on 23 September 1968 and received its amateur category SGAC certification in that October.

It is a small, single seat biplane powered by a 45 hp (34 kW) Salmson radial engine, with an entirely wooden structure.  The fabric covered wings are staggered, of parallel chord and without sweepback, dihedral or flaps.  The Aéro 30 is a single bay biplane with its lower wings attached to the bottom of the fuselage and the upper wing placed well above the fuselage by a pair of single, streamlined interplane struts.  Further bracing joins the lower fuselage to the upper wing near the top of the interplane struts, assisted by other struts between the upper fuselage and the wing centre section.  The cantilever tail surfaces are plywood covered. The vertical tail is tall and straight tapered.  The elevators carry trim tabs.

The fuselage is also plywood covered, the lower part flat sided but with curved decking.  This is deep enough immediately aft of the cockpit to meet the top of the single piece, rear-sliding canopy but tapers towards the tail.  The undercarriage is fixed, with a rear tailskid.  The main legs are attached to the fuselage just ahead of the wing leading edge and have steel spring shock absorbers. No brakes are fitted.

Operational history

Only one Aéro 30 was built. F-PPPA remains on the French DGAC register and may still be active.

Specifications

References

1960s French civil utility aircraft
Aero 30
Biplanes
Aircraft first flown in 1968
Single-engined tractor aircraft